The Van Buren–St. Leonard Border Crossing is located at the Saint Leonard – Van Buren Bridge that connects the town of Van Buren, Maine with St. Leonard, New Brunswick on the Canada–United States border.  During the 19th century, hand-pulled ferry service connected these two cities.  In 2008, a flood of the Saint John River severely damaged the Van Buren border station. A new facility was completed in 2013.

See also
 List of Canada–United States border crossings
 Saint Leonard – Van Buren Bridge

References

Canada–United States border crossings
Madawaska County, New Brunswick
Van Buren, Maine
1847 establishments in Maine
1847 establishments in New Brunswick